Essang Bassey (born August 12, 1998) is an American football cornerback for the National Football League (NFL). He played college football at Wake Forest, and played high school football at Columbus High School in Columbus, Georgia.

High school career 
Playing both offense and defense at Columbus High School in Georgia, Bassey split time between cornerback, wide receiver and running back. He also was an explosive kick returner, averaging 30 yards per return during his senior season. Bassey considered interest from Wofford, Tulane, Georgia Southern and Wake Forest until going to Winston-Salem for a camp and committing to Wake Forest three days later, citing the program's passion for the game and standards off the field.

College career 
Bassey received playing time during his true freshman season in every game in a reserve capacity, accruing 17 tackles.

As a sophomore, Bassey led the Wake Forest defense in snaps played and collected 66 tackles and three interceptions. He was also named an honorable mention on the All-ACC team after the season.

During his junior season, analysts noted his speed and technique as strong points of his game. Bassey was named second-team All-ACC.

Professional career

Denver Broncos
Bassey signed with the Denver Broncos as an undrafted free agent on April 25, 2020. He chose the Broncos over the Cincinnati Bengals and Baltimore Ravens, who also tried to sign Bassey. In Week 12 against the New Orleans Saints, Bassey recorded his first career interception off a pass thrown by Taysom Hill during the 31–3 loss. He was placed on injured reserve on December 9, 2020.

On September 1, 2021, Bassey was placed on the reserve/PUP list to start the season. He was activated on November 13. He was waived on December 18.

Los Angeles Chargers
On December 20, 2021, Bassey was claimed off waivers by the Los Angeles Chargers. He was waived on January 8, 2022.

Denver Broncos (second stint)
On January 10, 2022, Bassey was claimed off waivers by the Denver Broncos. He was waived on September 1, 2022 and re-signed to the practice squad. He was promoted to the active roster on September 14.

Personal life
Bassey's parents were Nigerian immigrants. He is a Christian.

References

External links 
 Denver Broncos bio
 Wake Forest Demon Deacons bio

1998 births
Living people
Players of American football from Columbus, Georgia
American sportspeople of Nigerian descent
American football cornerbacks
Wake Forest Demon Deacons football players
Denver Broncos players
Los Angeles Chargers players